Tunnel Hill may refer to:

 Tunnel Hill, Georgia, USA
 Tunnel Hill, Illinois, USA
 Tunnel Hill, Ohio, USA
 Tunnelhill, Pennsylvania, USA
 Tunnel Hill, Worcestershire, England

See also
 Tunnel (disambiguation)
 Hill (disambiguation)